Germar Rudolf (born 29 October 1964), also known as Germar Scheerer, is a German chemist and a convicted Holocaust denier.

Background
Rudolf was born in Limburg an der Lahn, Hesse. In 1983 he took his Abitur in Remscheid, then studied chemistry in Bonn, graduating in 1989 with a master's degree. As a student, he joined the A.V. Tuisconia Königsberg zu Bonn and the K.D.St.V. Nordgau Prag zu Stuttgart, Catholic fraternities belonging to the Cartellverband. According to the website “Informationsdienst gegen Rechtsextremismus” (Information service against right-wing extremism), Rudolf was in 1985, a member of Schlesische Jugend (Silesian Youth), the youth section of the association The Landsmannschaft Schlesien - Nieder- und Oberschlesien e.V. ("Territorial Association of Silesia - Lower and Upper Silesia"). Still according to the site Informationsdienst gegen Rechtsextremismus, Rudolf participated the year after, at the Reichsgründungskommers (Reich Foundation Parties) of the ultra-nationalist student association Verein deutscher Studenten (VDSt, German Student League). In 1989, he also took on editorial responsibilities in the German newspaper of New Right Junge Freiheit, and was an author in the far-right journals: Staatsbriefe, Sleipnir, Deutschland in Geschichte und Gegenwart. After supporting the CSU/CDU, he became a member of the Republicans. After his military service with the German Air Force, in October 1990 he joined the Max Planck Institute for Solid State Research at Stuttgart, where he prepared a PhD thesis.

In 1991, Rudolf began work on a paper entitled Report on the formation and verifiability of cyanide compounds in the Auschwitz "gas chambers" on behalf of the Düsseldorf attorney Hajo Herrmann, a former Luftwaffe pilot. In 1993, this work was reported in the media, and Rudolf was told not to enter the Max Planck Institute again without permission. When he did so, his employment was terminated without notice. In 1994, this dismissal was converted into a termination by mutual agreement. In 1996, the University of Stuttgart asked Rudolf to withdraw his application for a final PhD examination, or it would be denied, rendering his PhD thesis worthless. The legal basis for this is a German law which allows universities to deny or withdraw academic degrees where the candidate has used his academic credentials or knowledge to commit a crime. Rudolf subsequently withdrew his application.

Between 1991 and 1994, Herrmann and other lawyers used Rudolf's Auschwitz report to defend several Holocaust deniers, among them Otto Ernst Remer, a former Wehrmacht officer charged with Volksverhetzung (inciting hatred).  Rudolf knew his work would be associated with Holocaust denial, but insisted that even Remer had a right to legal defense.  Rudolf stated that his findings at Auschwitz and Birkenau "completely shattered his world view".  Among other things, Rudolf's report claims that only insignificant traces of cyanide compounds can be found in the samples taken from Auschwitz.  However, Richard Green and Jamie McCarthy from The Holocaust History Project have criticized the report, saying that like Fred Leuchter in his report, Rudolf did not discriminate against the formation of iron-based cyanide compounds, which are not a reliable indicator of the presence of cyanide, so that his experiment was seriously flawed.

Criminal convictions
In 1995, Rudolf was sentenced to 14 months in prison by the district court of Stuttgart for "inciting racial hatred" via the "Rudolf Report", as Holocaust denial is a criminal offence in Germany.  Rudolf avoided prison by fleeing to Spain, England, and finally to the United States.  His first marriage was to a German national with whom he had two children, and they settled at Hastings in England, until he and his wife divorced and she returned to Germany with their children.

All the while, criminal investigations continued in Germany.  In August 2004, the district court of Mannheim distrained a bank account in an attempt to confiscate 55% of Rudolf's business turnover from the years 2001–2004, some €214,000, but at that time the account contained only some €5,000.  Rudolf and his associates had earned this money by selling Holocaust denial publications which are banned in Germany, but Rudolf's business was in the UK and the US.

On 11 September 2004, Rudolf married a US citizen and settled in Chicago; the couple later had a child. He applied for political asylum, or at least for the right not to be expelled, but this was rejected in November 2004 on the basis that the application had no merits and was a case of frivolous litigation. Rudolf appealed against this ruling, and in early 2006 the US Federal Court in Atlanta found that his application was not "frivolous", but upheld the decision that it had no merit. The Immigration Services said that Rudolf did not have a right to file an application to remain with his family. On 14 November 2005, Rudolf was extradited to Germany where he was wanted for incitement of racial hatred (Volksverhetzung).  On arrival there, he was arrested by the police and transferred to a prison in Rottenburg, then to another in Stuttgart in Baden-Württemberg.

On 15 March 2007, the Mannheim District Court sentenced him to two years and six months in prison for inciting hatred, disparaging the dead, and libel. Rudolf accepted the verdict, and copies of his "Lectures on the Holocaust" were confiscated and destroyed. The prosecution's initial request to confiscate €214,000 was reduced to €21,000, the total turnover from the sales of the book. He was released from prison on 5 July 2009 and now lives in the US with his wife and daughter.

In July 2019, Rudolf was arrested near his home in Red Lion, Pennsylvania for "open lewdness" after being found exercising at 4:06 a.m. in a public park "naked from the waist down."

Publications
After Rudolf was dismissed from the Max Planck Institute, he began to publish books promoting Holocaust denial. He founded Castle Hill Publishers in 1997 based in Hastings, England with Theses & Dissertations Press as its American outlet. In 2000, Rudolf initiated an English language Holocaust Handbooks Series, a series of Holocaust denial titles which, as of 2013, encompassed 25 titles. Furthermore, Rudolf is closely associated with the Belgian Holocaust denial organization Vrij Historisch Onderzoek (VHO). Until his arrest in late 2005, he published the now defunct "Vierteljahreshefte für freie Geschichtsforschung" (Quarterly journal for free historical research), described by the German Office for the Protection of the Constitution as "a right-wing extremist organ."

Selected publications
 Auschwitz-Lies: Legends, Lies, and Prejudices on the Holocaust, with Carlo Mattogno (Theses & Dissertations Press, 2005), 
 Dissecting the Holocaust: The Growing Critique of Truth and Memory (Theses & Dissertations Press, 3rd edition, 2003), 
 The Rudolf Report: Expert Report on Chemical and Technical Aspects of the Gas Chambers of Auschwitz (Theses & Dissertations Press, 3rd edition, 2003),

References

External links
 "Leuchter, Rudolf and the Iron Blues". An essay by Richard J. Green. The Holocaust History Project (1997)
 "Chemistry is not the science: Rudolf, Rhetoric & Reduction". Response to Rudolf's report  by  Richard J. Green and Jamie McCarthy. The Holocaust History Project (1999)
 The 2004 annual report by the German Federal Office for the Protection of the Constitution

1964 births
Living people
People from Limburg an der Lahn
20th-century German chemists
German people convicted of Holocaust denial
The Republicans (Germany) politicians